Now Deh Khanduz (also Romanized as Now Deh Khāndūz and Now Deh Khān Dūz) is a city and capital of Cheshmeh Saran District, in Azadshahr County in Golestan Province, in northern Iran.  At the 2006 census, its population was 2,095, in 562 families.

References

Populated places in Azadshahr County

Cities in Golestan Province